The Kosrae flying fox (Pteropus ualanus) is a species of megabat in the genus Pteropus found on the island of Kosrae, Micronesia.

References

Pteropus
Fauna of Micronesia
Mammals described in 1883
Taxa named by Wilhelm Peters
Bats of Oceania